Yusuf bin Alawi bin Abdullah (born 1945) is an Omani politician. He was the Sultanate of Oman's Minister Responsible for Foreign Affairs. It is important to clarify that "Ministers in Responsibility" were previously appointed as the Sultan was intended to hold the official position of "Minister of Foreign Affairs" himself.

Early life
Yusuf bin Alawi studied and worked in Kuwait. In 1970 he met Sultan Qaboos bin Said al Said for the first time, shortly after his take-over. Alawi had been a dissident and associated with a Dhofar secession movement against the current Sultan's father. However, once Sultan Qaboos acceded power, he encouraged Omani dissidents to come out of overseas exile and assist in the rebuilding of Oman. In the period between 1973 to 1974 Yusuf bin Alawi occupied an ambassador role in Beirut.

Career

He was appointed as the Minister Responsible for Foreign Affairs in 1997 by Royal Decree No. 85/97 and was replaced on 18 August 2020 with Sayyid Badr bin Hamad bin Hamood Al Busaidi (actioned by Royal Decree No. 111/2020) as part of a significant government restructure.

Alawi has recently met with the US Secretary of State in Washington to discuss ways to better engage Iran. Oman is unusual among Arab states of the Persian Gulf in that it has a long history of cordial relations with Tehran, something Washington is keen to make use of in resolving a number of regional security issues.

Hacking
In 2019, it was revealed that Yusuf bin Alawi had been targeted by Project Raven; a UAE clandestine surveillance and hacking operation targeting other governments, militants and human rights activists critical of the UAE monarchy. Using a "sophisticated spying tool called Karma", they managed to hack a device belonging to Yusuf bin Alawi.

See also
 Foreign Ministry (Oman)
 List of foreign ministers in 2017

References

External links
OMAN - Yusef Bin Alawi Bin Abdullah., AllBusiness.com, February 21, 2000
Ministry of Foreign Affairs of the Sultanate of Oman

1945 births
Living people
Omani Muslims
Omani politicians
Ambassadors of Oman to Lebanon
Foreign ministers of Oman
Government ministers of Oman
People from Salalah
20th-century Omani people
21st-century Omani politicians